"Baby Don't Forget My Number" is a song by German dance-pop group Milli Vanilli. The track was released in December 1988 as the second single from their debut album, All or Nothing (1988), as well as its American counterpart, Girl You Know It's True (1989). It became the first of their three number-one hits on the US Billboard Hot 100 chart in 1989, earning a gold certification from the Recording Industry Association of America (RIAA). Worldwide, the single reached the top 10 in seven other countries and was certified gold in Australia, where it charted for 36 weeks.

Charts

Weekly charts

Year-end charts

Certifications

References

1988 singles
1988 songs
Arista Records singles
Billboard Hot 100 number-one singles
Hansa Records singles
Milli Vanilli songs
Song recordings produced by Frank Farian
Songs written by Frank Farian